Nicholas John Evans (born 9 September 1954) was an English cricketer. He was a right-handed batsman and a right-arm medium-pace bowler who played for Somerset. He was born in Weston-super-Mare.

He made a single first-class appearance for Somerset, during the 1976 season, having played in the Minor Counties Championship since 1972. Playing against Worcestershire, Evans scored a duck in the only innings in which he batted, and bowled 18 wicketless overs during  the match. He continued to play in the Minor Counties Championship until 1978.

External links
Nick Evans at Cricket Archive 

1954 births
English cricketers
Living people
Somerset cricketers
People from Weston-super-Mare